Thomas M. Boswell (born October 11, 1947, in Washington, D.C.) is a retired American sports columnist.

Career
Boswell spent his entire career at the Washington Post, joining it shortly after graduating from Amherst College in 1969. He became a Post columnist in 1984. Writing primarily about baseball, he is credited with inventing the total average statistic.  In 1994, he appeared several times in the Ken Burns series Baseball, sharing insightful commentary into the history of America's national pastime; he appeared again in "The Tenth Inning," Burns' 2010 extension of the series.

In addition to the Post, he has written for Esquire, GQ, Playboy and Inside Sports. He also makes frequent television appearances.

On October 19, 2020, Boswell announced in his Washington Post column that he would not be covering the World Series for the first time since 1975. The 72-year-old Boswell cited health concerns related to the COVID-19 pandemic, saying that it was too risky for someone at his age to make the trip. Boswell pointed out in his column that at the time, the 1975 World Series was considered the greatest World Series ever played, largely due to the dramatic game six that ended with Carlton Fisk’s historic home run. The drama of the series convinced him to remain a journalist with the Post and, in his column, he speculates “Where would I be today if Fisk’s ball had gone foul?”

Boswell's column compelled the Boston Globe’s Dan Shaughnessy to also write a column about missing the World Series for the first time in his career.  Like Boswell, his column listed some of the greatest moments he had experienced covering the games.

On May 7, 2021, Boswell announced that he would be retiring at the end of June 2021 in a column in The Washington Post.

Awards
In 2018, Boswell was inducted into the National Sports Media Association's Hall of Fame. Previously, he had been inducted into the Washington DC  Professional Chapter of the Society of Professional Journalists Hall of Fame and the Washington, DC Sports Hall of Fame, one of only seven sports writers among the 140 members, who include Walter Johnson, Red Auerbach, Bones McKinney, and National Sports Media Association Hall of Famers Shirley Povich and Bob Wolff.

Books
 How Life Imitates the World Series (1982)
 Why Time Begins on Opening Day (1984)
 Strokes of Genius (1987)
 The Heart of the Order (1989)
 Game Day: Sports Writings 1970–1990 (1990)
 Cracking the Show (1994)
 Diamond Dreams (with Walter Iooss) (1996)

References

External links
Boswell's columns at The Washington Post

1947 births
Living people
Amherst College alumni
American sportswriters
American columnists
Baseball writers
The Washington Post journalists
Journalists from Washington, D.C.